The 2021 season of the astronomy TV show Star Gazers starring Trace Dominguez started on January 4, 2021.  Episodes of the television series are released on the show's website at the start of the month, up to a month prior to any episode's broadcast date.

Starting with the episode produced for the week of April 5, 2021, the show's official website started listing a new system for production codes for the episodes. For example, the production code for the episode produced for the week of March 29, 2021 was listed as 2021–13; while, the production code for the episode produced for the week of April 5, 2021 was listed as STGZ106. However, the website made scripts for these episodes available; and, the scripts continued to use the older style production codes. The script of the episode for the week of April 5, 2021 listed the production code as 2021–14.

2021 season

References

External links 
  Star Gazer official website
 

Lists of Jack Horkheimer: Star Gazer episodes
2021 American television seasons